Emma Romeu (Havana) is a writer and geographer who has dedicated her career to environmental journalism. She has published articles in National Geographic Magazine and other prestigious magazines.

References

External links
  Informative page of Emma Romeu

Cuban geographers
Cuban non-fiction writers
Cuban women children's writers
Cuban women writers
living people
magazine writers
Mexican geographers
Mexican non-fiction writers
Mexican women children's writers
Mexican women writers
non-fiction environmental writers
year of birth missing (living people)